The Cooper T87 is a special purpose-built open-wheel race car, originally built by British manufacturer Cooper Cars, that was designed and developed by British racing driver and engineer Martin Brain, specifically for both hillclimb racing and Formula Libre competitions, in 1967. The car itself was based around a Formula 2 chassis, and was equipped with a naturally aspirated  Daimler SP 250, usually found in a Daimler 250, which produced . It competed in a number of races and events, before it was sold to Clive Oakley, who continued to use it in its original guise for a while, before later fitting it with a  Rover V8. Brain had previously fitted a  Chrysler V8 engine to a Cooper T81 Formula One car chassis.

References

Open wheel racing cars
Cooper racing cars